This is a list of notable baked or steamed bread varieties. This list does not include cakes, pastries, or fried dough foods, which are listed in separate Wikipedia articles. It also does not list foods in which bread is an ingredient which is processed further before serving.

Breads

See also

 List of American breads
 List of baked goods
 List of brand name breads
 List of bread dishes
 List of bread rolls
 List of British breads
 List of French breads
 List of Indian breads
 List of Pakistani breads
 List of sourdough breads
 List of buns
 List of cakes
 List of cookies
 List of pancakes
 List of pastries
 List of pies, tarts and flans
 List of puddings
 List of quick breads
 List of sandwiches
 List of sweet breads
 List of Swiss breads
 List of toast dishes
 List of Uruguayan breads

References

Breads